Graciosa Island or commonly La Graciosa (Spanish for "graceful") is a volcanic island in the Canary Islands of Spain, located  north of Lanzarote across the Strait of El Río. It was formed by the Canary hotspot. The island is part of the Chinijo Archipelago and the Chinijo Archipelago Natural Park. It is administrated by the municipality of Teguise in the neighboring island of Lanzarote. In 2018 La Graciosa officially became the eighth Canary Island with few real effects. Before then, the island had the status of an islet, administratively dependent on the island of Lanzarote. The only two settlements on the island are Caleta de Sebo in the southeastern part of the island and summer-residence Casas de Pedro Barba.

The population is about 700. Tourism is the main industry along with fishing. Every year, tourists flock to the island for its tempered climate and its sandy volcanic coasts. The island has a school, lyceum, post office, supermarkets, medical center, pharmacy, a Bankia bank branch, port, beaches, bar-restaurants and a square.
Because of the transportation cost, everyday shopping is more expensive than in the other islands.

Streets and roads on La Graciosa are unpaved sand. Motor vehicles are strictly limited to a handful of licensed vehicles for special purposes. Access to the island is by a 25-minute ferry crossing from Órzola on Lanzarote to the harbour in the village. There is a campsite on the island situated on Playa del Salado at the western edge of Caleta del Sebo.

Geographical features
The island is extremely arid and entirely made up of bushes and dry soil. There are no natural water sources on the island; desalinated water has been piped directly from neighbouring Lanzarote since 2001.
Water supply is at risk when the pipe gets broken.

Playa de la Cocina is a well known beach in the southwestern part of the island.

References

R. Pott, J. Hüppe, W. Wildpret de la Torre, Die Kanarischen Inseln. Natur- und Kulturlandschaften, Ulmer Eugen Verlag, 2003, 

 
Islands of the Canary Islands